Shalingzi East railway station  is a station of Jingbao Railway in Hebei.

See also

List of stations on Jingbao railway

Railway stations in Hebei
Xuanhua